The Argentine fat-tailed mouse opossum (Thylamys sponsorius) was formerly considered a species opossum in the family Didelphidae. It is found in the eastern foothills of the Andes in northern Argentina and southern Bolivia. Its dorsal fur is gray brown to dark brown. Its ventral fur is gray-based except for the white to yellowish chest hairs. It has been distinguished from T. cinderella by its postorbital ridges. T. cinderella has well-developed postorbital ridges in both juveniles and adults that extend laterally behind the eye sockets. Only adults of T. sponsorius have fully developed postorbital ridges, and these do not extend laterally behind the eye sockets. However, mitochondrial DNA sequence analysis does not support the population being distinct from T. cinderella.

References

Opossums
Marsupials of Argentina
Mammals of Bolivia
Marsupials of South America
Mammals described in 1921
Taxa named by Oldfield Thomas
Taxobox binomials not recognized by IUCN